The 1981 season was the Oakland Raiders' 22nd since they were founded, their 12th in the National Football League and their third under head coach Tom Flores. The team failed to improve on their 11–5 record from 1980, and the Raiders went 7–9 and became the fourth team in NFL history to enter a season as the defending Super Bowl champions and miss the playoffs. The 1981 Raiders set an NFL record by being shut out three consecutive times. The passing game fell off badly, being 26th and throwing 28 interceptions. After the defense led the NFL in interceptions and takeaways in 1980, they were dead last in 1981 and were –16 in turnover differential. It was also their last season in Oakland until 1995 and their losing record snapped a streak of 16 consecutive winning seasons. This was the only season from 1965 to 1986 where the Raiders finished with a losing record.

Offseason

NFL Draft

Roster

Regular season

Schedule

Game summaries

Week 1

Week 2

Week 3

Standings

References 

Oakland Raiders seasons
Oakland
Oakland